Charles Campbell "Chic" Milligan (26 July 1930 – February 2020) was a Scottish professional footballer who played as a defender.

References

External links

Chic Milligan at Coludata.co.uk

1930 births
2020 deaths
Association football defenders
Scottish footballers
Ardrossan Winton Rovers F.C. players
Colchester United F.C. players
English Football League players